The Patience Stone is a 2012 French-Afghan war drama film directed by Atiq Rahimi, based on his 2008 novel of the same title. Written by Jean-Claude Carrière and the director, the film stars Golshifteh Farahani, Hamid Djavadan, Massi Mrowat, and Hassina Burgan.

The film was selected as the Afghan entry for the Best Foreign Language Oscar at the 85th Academy Awards, although it was not nominated. Golshifteh Farahani was nominated for the Most Promising Actress award at the 39th César Awards. The film is set in Afghanistan and filmed in-country and in areas of Morocco that resembled Soviet-era housing in Kabul. It was produced with participation from the French Ministry of Culture (Ministère de la Culture), Centre national du cinéma et de l'image animée, and multiple independent film production companies. The U.S. release was distributed by Sony Picture Classics.

Plot
The movie and the book is based on old Persian Mythology, Sang-e Sabour سنگ صبور, a magic stone that one can talk to disclose all their secrets and hardship. Once all is told, the stone explodes, as if the burden of the person has been transferred to it and the person is relieved of their depressed state. The story happens somewhere, in war-torn Afghanistan, and is about a young woman in her thirties who watches over her older husband in a decrepit room. He is reduced to a vegetative state because of a bullet in the neck. Not only is he abandoned by his companions in Jihad (one of whom has shot him during an argument), but also by his brothers.

One day, the woman decides to tell the truth to her silent husband, explaining to him her feelings about their relationship. She talks about her childhood, her suffering, her frustrations, her loneliness, her dreams, her desires. She says things she could never have said before, even though they have been married for 10 years. The paralyzed husband unconsciously becomes her sang-e sabour, absorbing all her sufferings and secret suppressed thinking.

In her wait for her husband to come back to life, the woman struggles to survive and live. She finds refuge in her aunt's place, who is a prostitute, and the only relative who understands her. The woman seeks to free herself from suffering through the words she delivers audaciously to her husband. Meanwhile, she starts a relationship with a young soldier who helps her financially and around the house.

The story also reveals social problems like male dominance and the fact that many Afghan women have been neglected and humiliated for so long.

Cast
 Golshifteh Farahani as The woman
 Hamid Djavadan as The man (as Hamidreza Javdan)
 Hassina Burgan as The aunt
 Massi Mrowat as The young soldier
 Mohamed Al Maghraoui as The mullah (as Mohamed Maghraoui)
 Malak Djaham Khazal as The neighbor
 Malik Akhlaqi as The Malikdelha
 Marwa Safa Frotan as the childhood of Golshifteh
 Sofia Frotan as sister of Golshifteh
 Yesna Frotan as the smaller sister of Golshifteh

Critical reception
The Patience Stone has a 'fresh' rating of 86% on Rotten Tomatoes.

See also
 List of submissions to the 85th Academy Awards for Best Foreign Language Film
 List of Afghan submissions for the Academy Award for Best Foreign Language Film

References

External links
 Official site at Sony Pictures Classics
 
 
 
 

2012 films
2012 war drama films
Adultery in films
Dari-language films
Films scored by Max Richter
Films based on French novels
Films directed by Atiq Rahimi
Films set in Afghanistan
Medical-themed films
French war drama films
Afghan drama films
2012 drama films
Sony Pictures Classics films
2010s French films